The Rainbow (Dutch: Regenboog) was an alliance of Dutch political parties, which included: the Political Party of Radicals, the Pacifist Socialist Party, the Evangelical People's Party and the Communist Party of the Netherlands.

The parties entered in the 1989 European Parliament elections with a common list. The alliance won 7% of the vote, which gave it two seats in the European Parliament, one was taken by Nel van Dijk (CPN) and another by Herman Verbeek (PPR). In the 1984 European Parliament elections the parties, together with the Green Party of the Netherlands had also formed a common list called Green Progressive Accord. The alliance was renamed on instigation of the PSP, which disliked the term "green". The alliance executive was chaired by Wim de Boer.
In the 1989 parliamentary election the three parties together formed a common list called GreenLeft. In 1990 the parties dissolved and GreenLeft was formed as a political party.

European election result

References

See also

List of GreenLeft Members of the European Parliament

GroenLinks
Political party alliances in the Netherlands